Gnorismoneura silvatica is a moth of the family Tortricidae. It is found in Vietnam.

The wingspan is 17 mm. The ground colour of the forewings is cream slightly tinged with brownish. The strigulation (fine streaking) is weak and brownish. The markings are brown. The hindwings are greyish with darker, diffuse strigulation.

Etymology
The specific epithet refers to the habitat of the species and is derived from Latin silvatica (meaning relating to forest).

References

Moths described in 2008
Archipini
Moths of Asia
Taxa named by Józef Razowski